R98 may refer to:

 R-98 (missile), a Soviet air-to-air missile
 
 , a destroyer of the Royal Navy
 Renholdningsselskabet af 1898, a Danish waste management company